Amphigonia hepatizans is a moth of the family Noctuidae first described by Achille Guenée in 1852. It is found in the Indian subregion, Sri Lanka, Thailand, Andaman Islands, Sundaland and Sulawesi.

Adults have large forewings with acute margins which are distinctly angled centrally.

References

Moths of Asia
Moths described in 1852
Catocalinae